The 2017–18 Dallas Stars season was the 51st season for the National Hockey League franchise that was established on June 5, 1967, and 25th season since the franchise relocated from Minnesota prior to the start of the 1993–94 NHL season. The Stars failed to qualify for the playoffs for the second straight year. It was the tenth time that the Stars missed the playoffs since moving to Dallas in 1993, which was more than the franchise had missed back when the franchise was based in Minnesota, nine (missed playoffs in 1969, 1974, 1975, 1976, 1978, 1979, 1987, 1988, and 1993).

Standings

Schedule and results

Preseason
The Stars released their preseason schedule on June 9, 2017.

Regular season
The Stars' regular season schedule was published on June 22, 2017.

Player statistics
Final
Skaters

Goaltenders

†Denotes player spent time with another team before joining the Stars.  Stats reflect time with the Stars only.
‡Traded mid-season
Bold/italics denotes franchise record

Awards and honors

Awards

Milestones

Transactions
The Stars have been involved in the following transactions during the 2017–18 season.

Trades

Free agents acquired

Free agents lost

Claimed via waivers

Lost via waivers

Players released

Lost via retirement

Player signings

Draft picks

Below are the Dallas Stars' selections at the 2017 NHL Entry Draft, which was held on June 23 and 24, 2017 at the United Center in Chicago.

Draft notes:
 The Chicago Blackhawks' first-round pick went to the Dallas Stars as the result of a trade on June 23, 2017 that sent Anaheim's first-round pick in 2017 (29th overall) and a third-round pick in 2017 (70th overall) to Chicago in exchange for this pick.

References

Dallas Stars seasons
Dallas Stars
Dallas Stars
Dallas Stars
2010s in Dallas
2017 in Texas
2018 in Texas